The Women's time trial at the 2005 UCI Road World Championships took place over a distance of  in Madrid, Spain on 21 September 2005.

Final classification

Source

References

Women's Time Trial
UCI Road World Championships – Women's time trial
2005 in women's road cycling